Celadonia is a genus of beetles in the family Callirhipidae. It was described by Laporte de Castelnau in 1840.

Species
 Celadonia bicolor (Laporte de Castelnau, 1834)
 Celadonia bocourti Pic, 1927
 Celadonia gounelleii (Pic, 1916)
 Celadonia hoodii (Saunders, 1834) (type species)
 Celadonia laportei Hope
 Celadonia luteonotata (Pic, 1907)
 Celadonia scapularis (Laporte de Castelnau, 1834)

References

Callirhipidae
Byrrhoidea genera